Bishop Meron Mazur, O.S.B.M. (born 5 February 1962 in Prudentópolis, Paraná, Brazil) is a Brazilian Ukrainian Greek Catholic hierarch. He is currently the eparchial bishop of the Ukrainian Catholic Eparchy of Imaculada Conceição in Prudentópolis, an office that he has held since 12 May 2014. From 12 December 2005 until his assumption of his present position, he was the titular bishop of Simitthu and the auxiliary bishop of the São João Batista em Curitiba.

Life
Bishop Mazur was born into a family of ethnically Ukrainian Greek Catholics in Brazil. After attending a minor Basilian seminary, he joined the Order of Saint Basil the Great, where he had a profession on February 10, 1981 and a solemn profession on January 1, 1988. Mazur was ordained as a priest on September 8, 1990, after studies at the St. Basil's Seminary-Studium in Curitiba. He continued his studies in Italy in the Pontifical Atheneum of St. Anselm, graduating with a baccalaureate in Sacred Theology and with a licentiate in Educational Sciences from the Salesian Pontifical University.

After returning from Italy, he had various pastoral assignments and served as a professor, a superior and a rector at the Basilian Institutes in Brazil. During 2004-2005 he was a Protohegumen (Provincial Superior) of the Basilians in Brazil

On December 21, 2005 Fr. Mazur was nominated by Pope Benedict XVI and on February 26, 2006 consecrated to the Episcopate as an auxiliary bishop. The principal consecrator was Cardinal Lubomyr Husar, the Head of the Ukrainian Greek Catholic Church.

References

1962 births
Living people
People from Paraná (state)
Pontifical Atheneum of St. Anselm alumni
Salesian Pontifical University alumni
Bishops of the Ukrainian Greek Catholic Church
Order of Saint Basil the Great
Brazilian people of Ukrainian descent
Eastern Catholic bishops in Brazil